Hermotimus of Clazomenae (fl. c. 6th century BCE), called by Lucian a Pythagorean, was a philosopher who first proposed, before Anaxagoras (according to Aristotle) the idea of mind being fundamental in the cause of change.  He proposed that physical entities are static, while reason causes the change. Sextus Empiricus places him with Hesiod, Parmenides, and Empedocles, as belonging to the class of philosophers who held a dualistic theory of a material and an active principle being together the origin of the universe.

Tertullian relates a story about Hermotimus (which he does not appear to believe). According to this story, Hermotimus' soul would depart his body during sleep, as if on a trip. His wife betrayed the oddity and his enemies came and burned his body while he was asleep, his soul returning too late.  The people of Clazomenae erected a temple for Hermotimus, disallowing women because of his wife's betrayal. This story and others about Hermotimus are found in Pliny the Elder, Lucian, Apollonius, and Plutarch.

Diogenes Laërtius records a story that Pythagoras remembered his earlier lives, one being Hermotimus, who had validated his own claim to recall earlier lives by recognizing the decaying shield of Menelaus in the temple of Apollo at Branchidae.

References

Ancient Greek metaphysicians
6th-century BC philosophers
Ancient Greek shamans
Presocratic philosophers
Year of birth unknown
Year of death unknown
People from Clazomenae